Calendulauda is a genus of lark in the family Alaudidae. Established by Edward Blyth in 1855, it contains eight species.

Taxonomy and systematics
The genus Calendulauda was introduced by the English zoologist Edward Blyth in 1855 with the Karoo lark as the type species. The name Calendulauda is a combination of the names of two other lark genera: Calendula and Alauda. All of the species in this genus were formerly assigned to the genus Mirafra and several were also formerly assigned to the genera Alauda and Certhilauda.

Species
The genus Calendulauda has eight extant species:

References

 
Bird genera
Taxa named by Edward Blyth